Shuhan-e Sofla or Showhan-e Sofla may refer to:
 Shuhan-e Sofla, Kermanshah
 Shuhan-e Sofla, Khuzestan